Yvette Roudy (born 10 April 1929) is a French politician. She served as a member of the National Assembly from 1986 to 1993, and from 1997 to 2002, representing Calvados. She was the Minister of Women's Rights from 1981 to 1986. She sponsored a law for equal pay in 1983.

References

1929 births
Living people
People from Gironde
Politicians from Nouvelle-Aquitaine
Socialist Party (France) politicians
Government ministers of France
Deputies of the 8th National Assembly of the French Fifth Republic
Deputies of the 9th National Assembly of the French Fifth Republic
Deputies of the 11th National Assembly of the French Fifth Republic
Mayors of places in Normandy
Women members of the National Assembly (France)
French women's rights activists
French socialist feminists
Women government ministers of France
20th-century French women politicians
21st-century French women politicians
Commanders of the Ordre national du Mérite
Officiers of the Légion d'honneur
Signatories of the 1971 Manifesto of the 343